The Continuing Revolution: A History of Physics from the Greeks to Einstein is a 1968 book by the philosopher Joseph Agassi. Published by McGraw-Hill Book Company, it written as a three-week discussion with Agassi's son Aaron.

1968 non-fiction books
American non-fiction books
Books about the history of science
English-language books
McGraw-Hill books
Philosophy of science books
Physics books